Venerable Zachariah the Recluse of Egypt  was an Egyptian Christian monk who lived during the 4th century in Scetis, Lower Egypt. He is the patron saint of society's outcasts. He served the homeless and poor, and is remembered as a monastic father.

His father, Carion the Egyptian, left his wife and two children to become a monk in Scetis. Zacharias was later sent to Scetis to become a monk with his father during a famine.

Venerable Zachariah the Recluse is commemorated 24 March in the Eastern Orthodox Church.

See also

Hermit
Poustinia
Desert Fathers
Coptic Orthodox Church

References

Orthodox Church in America

Ascetics
4th-century births
Egyptian Christian monks
Eastern Orthodox monks
Eastern Catholic monks
Coptic Christians from Egypt
Desert Fathers